The Nkomati mine is a large mine in the north-east of South Africa near Machadodorp in Mpumalanga. Nkomati represents one of the largest nickel reserves in South Africa having estimated reserves of 408.6 million tonnes of ore grading 0.33% nickel. The 408.6 million tonnes of ore contains 1.35 million tonnes of nickel metal.

References 

Mines in South Africa
Buildings and structures in Mpumalanga
Economy of Mpumalanga